The men's long jump at the 1952 Olympic Games took place on July 21 at the Helsinki Olympic Stadium. Twenty-seven athletes from 19 nations competed. The maximum number of athletes per nation had been set at 3 since the 1930 Olympic Congress. American athlete Jerome Biffle won the gold medal. It was the United States' sixth consecutive and 11th overall victory in the men's long jump. Hungary earned its first long jump medal with Ödön Földessy's bronze.

Summary

In the first round Meredith "Flash" Gourdine took the early lead with a 7.38m. Jerome Biffle, a former NCAA Champion at the University of Denver, was in second place with 7.21m and Ary de Sá was in third with 7.15m. In the second round Ödön Földessy jumped into second place with a 7.23m. In the third round the medals were decided, Gourdine getting a 7.53m to extend his lead, then Biffle carefully came down the runway to leap  to take the lead. That 7.57 would be well within Brown's range but he and Henk Visser failed to get a legal jump in. Biffle also was unable to get another jump in, while Gourdine made three solid attempts but was unable to improve his mark, giving Biffle the gold. Földessy got off a 7.30m in the fifth round to assure himself the bronze medal while de Sá tied Földessy's 7.23 and would have had the tie breaking edge without the 7.30.

Background

This was the 12th appearance of the event, which is one of 12 athletics events to have been held at every Summer Olympics. The only returning finalist from the 1948 Games was eighth-place finisher Felix Würth of Austria. George Brown of the United States came into the Olympics having been the best long jumper in the world for the previous 3 years and the third man to jump 8 meters ever. But Brown's 41 competition win streak ended at the US Olympic Trials, where he barely qualified for Helsinki. In wet conditions, everyone was having trouble with their run up.

Nigeria, Saar, the Soviet Union, Thailand, Turkey, and Venezuela each made their first appearance in the event. The United States appeared for the 12th time, the only nation to have long jumpers at each of the Games thus far.

Competition format

The 1952 competition used a two-round format with a divided final. The qualifying round gave each competitor three jumps to achieve a distance of 7.20 metres; if fewer than 12 men did so, the top 12 (including all those tied) would advance. The final provided each jumper with three jumps; the top six jumpers received an additional three jumps for a total of six, with the best to count (qualifying round jumps were not considered for the final).

Records

Prior to this competition, the existing world and Olympic records were as follows.

No new world or Olympic records were set for this event.

Schedule

All times are Eastern European Summer Time (UTC+3)

Results

Qualifying round

Qualifying Performance 7.20 (Q) or at least 13 best performers (q) advance to the Final.

Final

References

External links
Official Olympic Report, la84.org.

Athletics at the 1952 Summer Olympics
Long jump at the Olympics
Men's events at the 1952 Summer Olympics